Gevaş is a district of Van Province of Turkey. It is located on the south shore of Lake Van. In the last elections of March 2019, Murat Sezer from the Justice and Development Party (AKP) was elected Mayor. As Kaymakam, Hamit Genç was appointed by President Recep Tayyip Erdoĝan in July 2019.

Historically, Gevaş was for some time the main town of the Armenian kingdom of Vaspurakan and later between the 14th and 15th centuries the centre of a small Kurdish emirate. In their time the settlement had moved nearer to the lake. Later the town was incorporated in the Ottoman Empire. Before World War I, the district had a Muslim majority with a large Christian Armenian minority.

Main sights include surviving ruins of the castle, the monumental tomb known as Halime Hatun Kümbeti, built in 1358, very likely for the daughter of a local emir, a mosque built before 1446 (restoration in that year), the tomb of Sheikh Ibrahim, father of Halime Hatun as well as the ruins of an Armenian church in Ili, probably built after 941 and an Armenian Church/monastery on Kuşadası Island west of Aghtamar Island.

References

Towns in Turkey
Populated places in Van Province
Districts of Van Province
Van vilayet
Kurdish settlements in Turkey